The South Africa men's national field hockey team represents South Africa at international field hockey matches and tournaments.

Tournament history

Summer Olympics
 1996 – 10th place
 2004 – 10th place
 2008 – 12th place
 2012 – 11th place
 2020 – 10th place

World Cup
 1994 – 10th place
 2002 – 13th place
 2006 – 12th place
 2010 – 10th place
 2014 – 11th place
 2018 – 16th place
 2023 – 11th place

Africa Cup of Nations
 1993 – 
 1996 – 
 2000 – 
 2005 – 
 2009 – 
 2013 – 
 2017 – 
 2022 –

African Games
 1995 – 
 1999 – 
 2003 – 
 2023 – Qualified

African Olympic Qualifier
 2007 – 
 2011 – 
 2015 – 
 2019 –

Commonwealth Games
 1998 – 5th place
 2002 – 4th place
 2006 – 8th place
 2010 – 5th place
 2014 – 5th place
 2018 – 10th place
 2022 – 4th place

Hockey World League
 2012–13 – 15th place
 2014–15 – 22nd place
 2016–17 – 18th place

FIH Pro League
 2021–22 – 9th place
 2023–24 – Withdrew

FIH Hockey Nations Cup
 2022 –

Sultan Azlan Shah Cup
 2005 – 7th place
 2014 – 6th place
 2022 – 6th place

Champions Challenge I
 2001 – 
 2003 – 
 2005 – 5th place
 2009 – 5th place
 2011 – 
 2012 – 7th place

Current squad
Squad for the 2023 Men's FIH Hockey World Cup.

Head coach: Cheslyn Gie

Gallery

See also
South Africa women's national field hockey team
South Africa men's national under-21 field hockey team
South Africa men's national indoor hockey team

References

External links

FIH profile

African men's national field hockey teams
National team
Men's sport in South Africa
Field hockey